{{Infobox television
| image          =
| caption        = 
| genre          = Reality television
| creator        = Steve McCormack
| narrated       = 
| starring       = Louise JohnstonDanielle RobinsonVogue WilliamsClare Cara CavanaghMelina Skvortsova
| opentheme      = "Those Girls" by Talulah Does The Hula
| num_seasons    = 2
| num_episodes   = 12
| runtime        = 22 minutes
| network        = RTÉ 2
| country        = Ireland
| language       = Hiberno-English
| first_aired    = 
| last_aired     = 
| picture_format = HD
| audio_format   = Stereo
| preceded_by    = 
| related        = The CityThe Hills 
}}Fade Street is a reality television show produced by RTÉ Two in Ireland. The format is loosely based on the style of American reality-TV shows such as The Hills and The City. It follows the personal lives of a group of Dubliners, aged 20 to 29. The show's participants work in a variety of jobs, several of which are associated with the Dublin-based Stellar magazine.

According to RTÉ, the show is unscripted and responses are spontaneous. As in The Hills, many scenes in the show are manipulated by the show's creators. The characters are not given lines or a script, but instead react genuinely to the situations into which they are placed. Bystanders present during filming have called the reliability of this assertion into question, claiming the show's participants regularly do several retakes of scenes if the creators are not happy. In an RTÉ interview the cast denied allegations that the show is scripted, claiming that learning lines would be too difficult; Cici (one of the show's main characters) said, "it's completely unscripted".
The soundtrack, featuring songs used in the show coming from up-and-coming (or established) Irish music artists, is central to the series.
In August 2011 the show was renewed for a second season on RTÉ 2 Television, with the webisodes-portion exclusion on RTÉ Player.

Cast
  Main cast 
  Secondary cast

Critical reception 
The show received poor reviews from critics.
Rosemary MacCabe of The Irish Times described the show as "awful and brilliant in equal measure" and quoted William Butler Yeats, noting "a terrible beauty is born".

See also
 The Hills The City''

References

2010 Irish television series debuts
English-language television shows
Irish reality television series
RTÉ original programming
Television spin-offs
Television shows set in the Republic of Ireland